Livingstone Etse Satekla (born 5 March 1988), better known by his stage name Stonebwoy, is a Ghanaian Afropop, dancehall and reggae musician. 

He is the CEO of Burniton Music Group. He won the Best International Act: Africa category at the 2015 BET Awards and Artist of the Year at the 2015 Ghana Music Awards. He is also a recipient of two Billboard plaques. He has been described as the king of reggae and dance hall in Africa.  Stonebwoy is also an actor, having appeared in the movies Happy Death Day and My name is Ramadan. He is a global ambassador for sanitation. In September 2019, he was made the brand ambassador for Voltic Natural Mineral Water. He is the brand ambassador of Tecno mobile in Ghana. In 2022, he signed unto Universal Music Group’s Def Jam Recordings, and it's flagship Def Jam Recordings Africa. He’s poised to make three albums under the label.

Life and music career 
Stonebwoy pronounced "stoneboy" was born in Ashaiman in the Greater Accra region of Ghana and began making music in his early school days. He realized his talents and abilities as a lyricist and scriptwriter at an early age, remembering writing and acting drama pieces as far back as the fourth year in primary school.

He studied at Methodist Day Secondary School the same year with rapper Sarkodie where he obtained his high school certificate. He continued his tertiary education at University of Professional Studies to earn a degree in marketing in 2013.

Satekla is married to Louisa Ansong Satekla, with two children. Louisa is a dentist.

Recognition and musical style 
Stonebwoy normally ragga in Jamaican Patois (Patwa or Patwah), and is considered a "multifaceted artiste" due to the various musical styles he possesses. In 2015, he received many awards and nominations ranging from "Artist of the Year" to "Album of the Year". His sophomore album, Necessary Evil, was the recipient of 3 Ghana Music Awards from 6 nominations. Nana Appiah Mensah, CEO of gold dealership company Menzgold, sent out words of encouragement to Stonebwoy on Instagram for Stonebwoy being supportive. On 18 April 2019, Nana Appiah Mensah posted a photo of Dance hall act Stonebwoy saying he is proud of the Bhim Nation president for defending him and that God bless him.

He was listed as part of the 2019 50 (fifty) young CEOs, by YCEO and Avance media. The list which was launched earlier in 2018, was set out to honor distinguished young individuals pursuing the course of providing solutions to some of Ghana's pertinent problems.

Philanthropy
Stonebwoy established the ‘Livingstone Foundation’. In January 2017 the foundation announced a sponsorship package for five students of the Tema Methodist Day Senior High School, his alma mater. As part of celebrations for Stonebwoy's 30th birthday, the foundation donated a sum of GH¢5,000 to the accident ward of the Korle-Bu Teaching Hospital in March 2018. Stonebwoy has also opened the official BHIM merch shop in Ashaiman. Proceeds from the shop are used to fund activities of the Livingstone Foundation. In 2020, the Livingstone Foundation in collaboration with the BHIM Merchandise Shop gave out free sanitizers as parts of efforts to combat the coronavirus spread in Ghana. Stonebwoy also donated sanitizers and other items to the Police Department in Ashaiman to aid them in discharging their duties during the coronavirus pandemic in Ghana.

Endorsements 
Stonebwoy has recently been named the Brand Ambassador for 'Big Boss', a new energy drink. In September 2020, Stonebwoy was named Tecno Mobile brand ambassador and unveiled the Camon 16 Series in October 2020.

World tours and notable performances
Stonebwoy kicked off his world tour in the Euro-zone in August 2014. He performed in Germany, Italy, Spain and Austria. His 2016 Canada-America tour saw him perform in New York City, Ohio, Philadelphia and Ontario. In the same year, he rocked Perth, Melbourne, Brisbane and Sidney all in Australia.
His second Euro tour saw him travel to the Nordic to thrill fans in Denmark, Finland and Sweden in last quarter of 2017. Stonebwoy performed at Reggae Sumfest, Afro nation festival in Portugal, Rotterdam reggae festival, Uppsala Reggae Festival. Rototom Sunsplash. 

Stonebwoy performed at the Global Citizen Festival held at the Black Star Square in Accra on 24 September 2022. Stonebwoy was one of the headliners for the festival which was aimed at advocating for the end of extreme poverty in Africa and performed alongside the likes of Usher, SZA, Sarkodie etc. He was adjudged as one of the best performers on the show by patrons and critics alike.

Controversy 
On the eve of 18 May 2019, during the 20th edition of Vodafone Ghana Music Awards, a brawl erupted between the followers of Stonebwoy and his music rival Shatta Wale and his fans, which lead to Stonebwoy pulling out a gun on stage. They were both arrested and detained the following day. They both appeared in court where they pleaded not guilty to both their respective charges after which they were granted bail of GH¢50,000 each. They were stripped of the awards they picked up that night and were indefinitely banned from the program by Charterhouse, the organizers. They made peace by the 30th day of the very same month. His ban from the Awards show was lifted in the 2022 edition of the show.

Discography 
Satekla has so far released four studio album and many other singles since 2012.

2012: Grade 1 Album
Under "Samini Music", Stonebwoy recorded his first hit single "Climax" featuring Samini and mad "Ghetto Love" featuring Irene Logan. Both songs earned him nominations at the Ghana Music Awards. After this exposure, he released his debut album "Grade 1 Album". The album contains seventeen tracks which featured prominent Ghanaian artists in.

2014: Necessary Evil
Released on November 23, 2014; it is a 29 track album which featured the likes of Sarkodie. It includes tracks like Baafira, Sneaky, Gbedegbede, Candy, Pull up remix, and Cant Cool.

2017: Epistles of Mama
Released on 12 December 2017; the Epistles of Mama was dedicated to Satekla's late mother by name Mrs Catherine Lucy Aku Ametepe Satekla. The 24 track album features Sean Paul, King Promise, Burna Boy. The album peaked at Number thirteen (13) on Billboard chart top 200 albums worldwide. In 2018 ‘Epistles Of Mama (EOM)’ was rated the second-best album in the world according to reggaeville. The Album was honoured by YouTube for hitting over 10 million views.

2020: Anloga Junction 
On 24 April 2020, Stonebwoy released his fourth studio album which featured the likes of Keri Hilson (US), Nasty C (SA), Diamond Platnumz (Tanzania), Alicai Harley (Jamaica), Jahmiel (Jamaica), Zlatan (Nigeria), Kojo Antwi (Ghana), Chivv (Netherlands) and Spanker (Netherlands). He also worked with producers like Mix Master Garzy, Streetbeatz, M.O.G. Beatz, Spanker, Riga, Phantom, iPappi and others.

Singles 

Featured in
2021: "Guns of Navarone" (Sean Paul feat. Jesse Royal, Stonebwoy & Mutabaruka)

Awards and nominations

Entertainment Achievement Awards 
In March 2021, his album Anloga Junction won the Album of the Year award in the Entertainment Achievement Awards. He also won the Male Artist of the Year Award.

3Music Awards 
In March 2021, his album Anloga Junction won the Album of the Year award in the 3Music Awards. His song Putuu Freestyle (Prayer) won the Viral Song of the Year.

International Reggae and World Music Awards (IRAWMA) 
In May 2021, he was nominated for the 'Best African Dancehall Entertainer Award'.

References

External links

21st-century Ghanaian male singers
21st-century Ghanaian singers
1988 births
Living people
Male singer-songwriters
Dancehall singers
People from Volta Region
People from Greater Accra Region
21st-century philanthropists
Ghanaian philanthropists
Ghanaian chief executives
21st-century Ghanaian male actors
Ghanaian male film actors
University of Professional Studies alumni
Ghanaian business executives
Ghanaian reggae musicians